Liquid packaging board is a multi-ply paperboard with high stiffness, strong wet sizing and a high barrier coating, e.g. plastic. Only virgin paper fibers are used. The barrier coating must hold the liquid and prevent migration of air and flavors through the paperboard.

Manufacture
A liquid packaging board might be up to five plies and is formed on a multi-ply paper machine with online coating. The most common is to use three plies with a basis weight of about 300 g/m2. The base or middle ply is normally made of pulp from bleached or unbleached chemical pulp, CTMP or broke (waste paper from a paper machine). CTMP gives more bulk and stiffness. The top ply (inside) is made of bleached chemical pulp. The barrier coating depends on the application and might be applied on both sides. When induction welding is employed an aluminum foil layer is used for barrier protection and for heating. The back side of the board is the printing side and might have an extra ply made from chemical pulp of quality that is suitable for the printing applications. Liquid packages are normally heat sealed.

Cartons filled with short-shelf-life dairy products use board that are barrier coated on both sides with one layer of low density polyethylene. For long-shelf-life products it is common to use aluminium foil as barrier coating together with polyethylene. Commonly the plastic coating on the top side is 12 - 20 g/m2 and on the reverse side 15 - 60 g/m2.

Sanitary and aseptic processing of food contact products are critical.

Liquid packaging board is used for two package types: brick and gable top cartons.

Applications
Packaging for beverages. The most common applications are milk and juicebox packaging.

See also
plastic-coated paper
Tetra Brik

References

Paperboard
Packaging materials